The following is a list of the 13 cantons of the Mayotte department, in France, following the French canton reorganisation which came into effect in March 2015:

 Bandraboua
 Bouéni
 Dembeni
 Dzaoudzi
 Koungou
 Mamoudzou-1
 Mamoudzou-2
 Mamoudzou-3
 Mtsamboro
 Ouangani
 Pamandzi
 Sada
 Tsingoni

References

Geography of Mayotte
Mayotte 2